Agua Preta virus is an unaccepted species of virus, suggested to belong to the order Herpesvirales and family Herpesviridae, as determined by thin-section electron microscopy. It was isolated from the gray short-tailed bat, Carollia subrufa, in the Utinga Forest near Belém, Brazil.

References 

Herpesviridae
Unaccepted virus taxa